Cyprus's component of the 2014 European Parliament election was held on Sunday, 25 May 2014.

In total, 6 Members of the European Parliament were elected from Cyprus.

Parties
Ten parties or coalitions contested the European Parliament election in Cyprus:

AKEL – Left – New Forces (Progressive Party of Working People)
Democratic Party (DIKO)
Democratic Rally (DISY) (in coalition with European Party (EVROKO))
National Popular Front (ELAM)
Citizens' Alliance
EDEK Movement for Social Democracy – Green Party (coalition)
Action (D.R.A.Sy-Eylem)
Animal Party Cyprus
Message of Hope
Cyprus Socialist Party

There were also eight independent candidates.

Opinion polls

Results

Elected MEPs

The following candidates were elected:
Democratic Rally – European Party coalition – Eleni Theocharous and Christos Stylianides
AKEL – Left – New Forces – Takis Hadjigeorgiou and Neoklis Sylikiotis
Democratic Party – Costas Mavrides
EDEK – Green Party coalition – Dimitris Papadakis

References

External links
Official site – Cyprus Ministry of the Interior, Electoral Service

European Parliament elections in Cyprus
2014 in Cyprus
2010s in Cypriot politics
Cyprus